East Bengal Club is an Indian professional field hockey club located in Kolkata, West Bengal. It participates in various tournaments conducted by Hockey Bengal. The team plays its home matches mostly at the East Bengal Ground and also at the SAI Sports Complex at Salt Lake Stadium.

The club participates in the Calcutta Hockey League and the Beighton Cup. The team have won fourteen major state titles as of the 2022 season,

History
East Bengal Club started their hockey section after the Indian Independence in 1947 and got affiliated with the Bengal Hockey Association (BHA). The Club participated in the Calcutta Hockey League and the Beighton Cup and were the fourth Indian hockey team to win the Calcutta Hockey League in the 1960 season.

The club disbanded their hockey section in 2000, but was eventually revived after 21 years in 2021. In the next season in 2022, East Bengal won their tenth CHL title after 33 years.

Honours

League
Calcutta Hockey League
Champions (10): 1960, 1961, 1963, 1964, 1968, 1973, 1976, 1979, 1989, 2022

Cup
Beighton Cup
Champions (4): 1957, 1962, 1964, 1967
Runners-up (3): 1963, 1970, 1987

Current squad
The squad for the 2022 season:

Vikas Dahiya
Pardeep Mor
Anup Valmiki
Yuvraj Valmiki
Manpreet
Ajit Pandey
Roshan Kumar
Harjeet Singh
Chandan Singh
Maninder Singh
Prabhjot Singh
Iqtidar Israt
First Sharma
Aditya Singh
Nitish Neopane
Rohit
Balkar Singh
Yograj Singh
Raju Pal
Atul Island
Mohit
Arjun Yadav
Pawan Singh Chauhan
Naresh Kumar Chowdhury

Notable players
Notable players who have represented East Bengal Club includes Olympians Gurbux Singh, Joginder Singh, B. P. Govinda, Inam-ur Rahman, Vece Paes, Mohammed Shahid.

References

External links
Club website

East Bengal Club
Field hockey in West Bengal
Sports clubs in Kolkata
Indian field hockey clubs